Fernand Grenier (June 28, 1927 – January 19, 1988) was a Canadian politician from Quebec.

Background

He was born on June 28, 1927 near Lac-Mégantic, Quebec and made a career in education.

Member of the legislature

Grenier ran as a Union Nationale and won a seat to the Legislative Assembly of Quebec in the 1966 provincial election in the district of Frontenac.  He was defeated by Ralliement créditiste candidate Paul-André Latulippe in the 1970 election.

Mayor

He was Mayor of Nantes, Quebec from 1969 to 1971.

Political comeback

Grenier remained active in the Union Nationale.  He ran as the party candidate in Lotbinière in the 1973 election but was defeated.

He was re-elected in the 1976 election in the district of Mégantic-Compton and won.  He served as his party's House Whip from 1976 to 1980.

Federal politics

Grenier resigned his seat and ran as a Progressive Conservative candidate in the district of Mégantic-Compton-Stanstead in the 1980 federal election.  He was defeated against Liberal incumbent Claude Tessier.  After the defeat, Grenier attempted to win back his seat to the National Assembly of Quebec, but finished third.

Local politics

He served as a city councillor in Lac-Mégantic from 1986 until his death.

References

1927 births
1988 deaths
Mayors of places in Quebec
Union Nationale (Quebec) MNAs
People from Lac-Mégantic, Quebec